is a mountain with a height of  in the Northwest Highlands of Scotland. It lies on the Scoraig peninsula between the two Loch Brooms in Wester Ross.

Climbs usually start from the village of Badrallach and the peak provides fantastic views from its summit.

References

Mountains and hills of the Northwest Highlands
Marilyns of Scotland
Grahams